Euthauma is a genus of tephritid  or fruit flies in the family Tephritidae.

Species
Euthauma ghentianum Munro, 1949

References

Tephritinae
Tephritidae genera
Diptera of Africa